David Merritt (born September 8, 1971) is an American football coach for the Kansas City Chiefs for the National Football League (NFL) and former linebacker who served as the defensive backs coach for the Arizona Cardinals of the NFL. He was drafted by the Miami Dolphins in the seventh round of the 1993 NFL Draft. He played college football at North Carolina State.

Merritt also played for the Phoenix/Arizona Cardinals and has been a coach at  the University of Tennessee at Chattanooga and Virginia Military Institute and for the New York Jets.

Early years
Merritt was born in Raleigh, North Carolina. He attended Millbrook High School (Raleigh, North Carolina). Merritt was a member of the Millbrook High School inaugural Hall of Fame class in 2012

Coaching career

New York Jets
In , Merritt joined the New York Jets as a defensive assistant and linebackers coach.

New York Giants
Merritt was hired by the New York Giants as a defensive assistant and quality control coach in 2004. In 2006, he was promoted to secondary and safeties coach. Merritt won Super Bowl XLII and Super Bowl XLVI with the Giants, both times defeating the New England Patriots.

Arizona Cardinals
On February 21, 2018, Merritt was hired by the Arizona Cardinals as their new defensive backs coach.

Kansas City Chiefs
On February 8, 2019, Merritt was hired by the Kansas City Chiefs as their new defensive backs coach. Merritt won his third Super Bowl ring when the Chiefs defeated the San Francisco 49ers in Super Bowl LIV. Merritt got his fourth championship ring with the Chiefs as they defeated the Eagles in Super Bowl LVII.

References

External links
 New York Giants profile 

1971 births
Living people
American football linebackers
NC State Wolfpack football players
Miami Dolphins players
Phoenix Cardinals players
Arizona Cardinals players
Rhein Fire players
Chattanooga Mocs football coaches
New York Jets coaches
New York Giants coaches
Millbrook High School (NC) alumni
Sportspeople from Raleigh, North Carolina
Players of American football from Raleigh, North Carolina
Kansas City Chiefs coaches